The Next Chapter is a live album/DVD consisting of live performances around the world, interview snippets and studio recordings such as "Forge of Sauron", by progressive rock band Mostly Autumn. The DVD was released August 5, 2003.

Track listing 
 "Forge of Sauron"
 "Greenwood the Great"		 
 "Gap Is Too Wide"	 
 "Never the Rainbow"	 
 "Noise from My Head"	 
 "Please" 
 "Last Climb"
 "Shindig"		 
 "Spirits of Autumn Past"
 "Prints in Stone"
 "Mother Nature"
 "Something in Between"
 "Goodbye Alone"

Personnel 
 Bryan Josh – electric guitar, vocals, 6-string, 12-string acoustic, gregorian vocals on 8
 Heather Findlay – vocals, bodhrán, tambourine and bells
 Iain Jennings – keyboards, backing vocals, gregorian vocals on 8
 Liam Davison – electric slide guitar, vocals on 7 and 8, 6-string and 12-string acoustic
 Andy Smith – bass guitar
 Jonathan Blackmore – drums
 Angela Goldthorpe – flute, recorders, background vocals on 10

References 

Mostly Autumn live albums
2003 video albums
Live video albums
2003 live albums